Shawn Sisifo Lauvao (born October 26, 1987) is a former American football guard. He was drafted by the Cleveland Browns in the third round of the 2010 NFL Draft. He played college football at Arizona State.

College career
Lauvao started his last 33 games at Arizona State—17 at left guard, 12 at left tackle and four at right tackle. He earned Second Team All-Pac-10 honors during his junior and senior years.

Professional career
Although playing the left tackle spot in college, Lauvao projected as a guard in the NFL. He drew comparisons to Kynan Forney.

Cleveland Browns
Lauvao was drafted by the Cleveland Browns in the third round (92nd overall) of the 2010 NFL Draft. Lauvao became a starter his second season, starting all 16 games the next two seasons.

Washington Redskins
On March 11, 2014, Lauvao signed a four-year, $17 million contract with the Washington Redskins. He took over the starting left guard position in the Redskins' offensive line after the previous starter, Kory Lichtensteiger, switched to center.

In Week 3 of the 2015 season, Lauvao exited the game early with an ankle injury. On September 29, 2015, he was placed on injured reserve.

On November 21, 2017, Lauvao was placed on injured reserve after dealing with a stinger injury that sidelined him for a few weeks prior.

On May 4, 2018, Lauvao re-signed with the Redskins. On November 5, he was placed on injured reserve after suffering a torn ACL in Week 9.

References

External links
Arizona State Sun Devils bio
Cleveland Browns bio
Washington Redskins bio

1987 births
Living people
American football offensive guards
American football offensive tackles
American sportspeople of Samoan descent
Arizona State Sun Devils football players
Cleveland Browns players
Players of American football from Honolulu
Washington Redskins players